Al-Taraj Club is a Saudi Arabian professional sports club based in Qatif.  The club was founded in 1980 and plays its home matches at the Prince Nayef bin Abdulaziz Stadium.The club was formed in 1980 as a result of the coalition of Al-Bader and Al-Shate, the only two football clubs from Qatif at the time.

History 
The true beginnings of the club go back to the 1950s when a series of merges occurred with clubs in the area. This led to the formation of Al-Bader and Al-Shate, two clubs that eventually merged into Al-Taraji. This makes it not only the oldest club in Qatif, but the oldest club in the east coast of Saudi Arabia.

Current squad 

As of Saudi Second Division:

References

Notable players
Hassan Al-Raheb
Ahmed Al-Kassar
Ali Al-Shoalah
Mohammed Al-Ghanim
Dawod Al Saeed
Moslem Al Freej
Ahmed Al-Khodhair
Ahmed Al-Khater
Abdulrahman Al-Gassab
Abdulaziz Abualsaud

Taraji
Taraji
Taraji
Football clubs in Eastern Province, Saudi Arabia
Qatif